Mexico is a 1930 short animated film by Walter Lantz Productions, and stars Oswald the Lucky Rabbit. The soundtrack of the cartoon was missing for many years, until the discovery of a sound print in 2013. Then in 2014 the soundtrack version of the cartoon was uploaded to YouTube, however it was deleted due to the YouTube account being terminated then in 2015 and 2016 two other youtubers uploaded the soundtrack version of the cartoon as well.

Plot
Oswald and a big bear are competing each other in a cockfight. While the bear's rooster is larger and stronger, Oswald's is more agile. After his cock gets knocked down by a hard impact, Oswald feeds it with some special seeds. The seeds benefitted the rabbit's chicken significantly until the bear's was taken down for good.

Following his victory at the cockfighting event, Oswald is being paraded on a limousine. On the way, he spots a female raccoon whom he finds very attractive. Oswald jumps out of the car and comes to her. After a brief conversation, the rabbit and the raccoon became friends and started dancing around.

Back at the cockfighting arena, the bear was depressed by his defeat and doesn't know what to do next. He tries to get his rooster back on its feet, only to see it fall again. The disgruntled bear then walks out and decides to take his frustration on Oswald.

The film scene returns to Oswald who is still dancing around with the raccoon. Just then, the bear rushes in and confronts him. The bear tries to attack with a kick but Oswald cleverly catches the assailant's leg. The rabbit then takes off the bear's boot and gives a tickle on the foot, therefore incapacitating the bear who laughs uncontrollably. The bear attempts another assault, only to be tickled off by Oswald in the abdomen. In no time, Oswald's rooster comes in and tickles the bear out of the picture. Oswald then resumes his date with the raccoon.

References

External links
 Mexico at the Big Cartoon Database
 

1930 films
1930 animated films
1930s American animated films
1930s animated short films
American black-and-white films
Films directed by Walter Lantz
Animated films about bears
Films about raccoons
Films set in Mexico
Oswald the Lucky Rabbit cartoons
Universal Pictures animated short films
Walter Lantz Productions shorts
Cockfighting in film